Florida National University is a private for-profit university in Hialeah, Florida. It was established in 1988. The student body is diverse, though primarily Hispanic. It is accredited by the Southern Association of Colleges and Schools (SACS).

Student population

In 2019, 819 degrees were awarded across all undergraduate and graduate programs at Florida National University-Main Campus. 76.7% of these degrees were awarded to women, and 23.3% awarded men. The 2018 Graduation rate was 74.6%. Florida National University-Main Campus has a total enrollment of 3,981 students. The full-time enrollment at Florida National University-Main Campus is 2,673 students and the part-time enrollment is 1,308. This means that 67.1% of students enrolled at Florida National University-Main Campus are enrolled full-time.

Campus
The university has three locations. Its main campus is in Hialeah, the South Campus is in Miami and the Training Center is in Hialeah.

Athletics
The Florida National athletic teams are called the Conquistadors. The university is a member of the National Association of Intercollegiate Athletics (NAIA), primarily competing as an NAIA Independent within the Continental Athletic Conference since the 2018–19 academic year. The Conquistadors also compete as a member of the United States Collegiate Athletic Association (USCAA) as an Independent since their athletic program debut in the 2013–14 school year.

Florida National competes in 13 intercollegiate varsity sports: Men's sports include baseball, basketball, cross country, soccer, tennis and track & field; while women's sports include basketball, cross country, soccer, softball, tennis, track & field and volleyball.

History
In 2013, the school initiated an athletic program with the sport of men's basketball with Scott Schmidt appointed as the head coach and athletic director. The Conquistadors basketball team played its first game against Edward Waters College in Jacksonville, Florida, on October 26, 2013, losing by a score of 98–51.

In the fall of 2015, the university added men's soccer and women's volleyball. In the fall of 2019, Florida National had expanded to include eight more sports; which were baseball, women's basketball, men's and women's tennis, softball and men's and women's cross country. As of the fall of 2021, the Conquistadors also added men's and women's track & field.

Name dispute
In May 2013, Florida International University sued Florida National University over the similarity of the institution's names. Florida International University lost the lawsuit because it was deemed frivolous and was forced to pay FNU's attorney fees.

References

External links
 Official website
 Official athletics website

Universities and colleges in Miami-Dade County, Florida
1988 establishments in Florida
For-profit universities and colleges in the United States
USCAA member institutions
Private universities and colleges in Florida